The Kolkata Derby (locally known as "Boro Match") is the football match in Kolkata, between East Bengal and ATK Mohun Bagan (Mohun Bagan till 2019–20). In January 2020, the owners of a Kolkata based Indian Super League club ATK merged their brand with the football department of Mohun Bagan to become ATK Mohun Bagan. The rivalry between these two teams is almost 100 years old, and the matches witnessed large audience attendance and rivalry between patrons. It is considered to be one of the biggest Asian footballing rivalry. The first match was played on 8 August 1921 in Coochbehar Cup and latest match of this historical derby was played on 25 February 2023 in Indian Super League. The Kolkata Derby is considered to be greatest derby in Asian Football and also one of the biggest derbies in the world.

The two clubs meet at least 3 times a year, twice in the Indian Super League and once in the Calcutta Football League. Often these two clubs met in other competitions like the Durand Cup, IFA Shield, Super Cup etc.

Both clubs have huge and dedicated fan bases around the world, and represent a specific class of Bengali people, Mohun Bagan represented people existing in the western part of Bengal (known as Ghotis), while East Bengal is primarily supported by people hailing from the eastern part of pre-independence Bengal (known as Bangals). Culturally, this derby is very similar to the Scottish Professional Football League's Old Firm derby, since a majority of the Mohun Bagan supporters represent the 'nativist' population (similar to Rangers) and a majority of the East Bengal fans represent the 'immigrant' population (similar to Celtic). The celebrations of a derby win is traditionally marked with dishes prepared from either ilish or golda chingri, depending on which team wins. The East Bengal supporters celebrate their win with ilish courses, being associated to the eastern region of Bengal (now Bangladesh), where as the Mohun Bagan fans celebrate with courses of golda chingri.

Origins

Mohun Bagan is one of the oldest existing club of India having been established in 1889 in the city, then known under its anglicized name, Calcutta and till date one of the two most successful clubs in India, the other being East Bengal. The significant British influence in what was, until 1911, the nation's capital, ensured the game flourished, drawing players from other regions, and it is against this backdrop in which today's rivalry took root.

In 1920, the Jora Bagan club took field against Mohun Bagan who chose play without their star halfback Sailesh Bose, much to the chagrin of club vice-president Suresh Chandra Chaudhuri. Such was the industrialist's displeasure, he decided to form a new club and East Bengal was born. As Chaudhuri and his co-founders hailed from eastern part of Bengal, essentially now modern-day Bangladesh, the club became an identity for the people who migrated from that region during the partition of Bengal. This resulted in the clubs being backed by two different socioeconomic groups, although this has largely changed over period of time. The first ever clash happened on 8 August 1921 in Cooch Behar Cup semifinal which ended in a goalless draw. Mohun Bagan would win the following replayed match on 10 August 1921 by defeating East Bengal 3–0, courtesy to the goals from Rabi Ganguly, Paltu Dasgupta and Abhilash Ghosh. But due to tournaments like this not regarded as official events and Calcutta Football League being the only official competition, the first official meeting is considered to be the CFL match-up held on 28 May 1925 at the Calcutta Football Ground (now Mohun Bagan Ground) where East Bengal won 1–0 with the help of a solitary goal from Nepal Chakraborty.

Due to lack of proper maintenance and restoration of data, after many researches, the overall matches including competitive, walk overs and friendlies matches data have been retrieved as far as possible. Though the data is just an approximation, as of 27 November 2021, it is believed that the tally of overall meetings stands at 372 matches up till now, where East Bengal have been triumphant 129 times while Mohun Bagan 122 times, which also includes a walkover.

Colours

Traditional

Current

Brief history of the Derby 

The 1960s proved a golden period for Mohun Bagan and it concluded in perfect fashion for the Mariners. Having already won the league, Mohun Bagan then did the double, defeating their rivals on their own ground in the IFA Shield final. The 3–1 victory credited to the then revolutionary 4–2–4 formation employed by innovative coach Amal Dutta.

The wheel eventually turned, and the 1970s was East Bengal's decade. The Red and Gold Brigade remained undefeated in the Derbies for 1932 days. In fact, they lost only one derby (that too outside Kolkata) in six years (1970 to 1975) which culminated in a 5–0 IFA Shield win over their great rivals. The Red and Golds won with a record 5–0 scoreline and, with it, a record of five consecutive Shield victories. Such was the ignominy surrounding the heavy defeat that several Mohun Bagan players spent the night holed up on a boat in the Ganges trying to escape the wrath of shell-shocked supporters. Umakanto Palodhi, an ardent Mohun Bagan fan, committed suicide. He wrote in his suicide note that in his next life he will born as a Mohun Bagan footballer and will take revenge of that 0–5 defeat.

On 16 August 1980, 16 football fans died due to stampede and riot inside the Eden Gardens stadium, Kolkata on the occasion of a Kolkata Derby match in the Calcutta Football League.

The tables turned again. Mohun Bagan won 8 derbies in a row scoring 16 goals in total thus humiliating the red and golds. The most memorable derby on many accounts took place in 1997 at the semi-final of the Federation Cup, when a remarkable crowd of 131,781 – a record attendance for any sport in India – filled a heaving Salt Lake Stadium. India's most recognizable footballer, Baichung Bhutia, took centre stage, scoring a hat-trick as East Bengal triumphed 4–1. In 2009, Mohun Bagan beat East Bengal 5–3 with Chidi Edeh scoring a hat-trick for Bagan.

On 6 September 2015, another memorable derby took place when East Bengal FC equaled the record for the highest margin of victory in a Calcutta Football League Derby as they triumphed 4–0 against Mohun Bagan. South Korean forward Do Dong-hyun scored a free-kick brace while Mohammed Rafique and Rahul Bheke scored the other two as the Red and Gold brigade matched their own record which they set back on 23 May 1936, when they defeated the Green and Maroons by the similar 4–0 scoreline with goals from Laxminarayan, K. Prasad, Murgesh and Majid.

On 29 January 2022, ATK Mohun Bagan beat East Bengal 3–1 scores with a hat-trick from Kiyan Nassiri, son of former East Bengal player Jamshid Nassiri, and became the youngest player to score a hat-trick in the derby. East Bengal lost six consecutive derbies since 2019— one in the Durand Cup, one in the I-League and the rest in the ISL.

First official derby

Statistics

Trophy counts 
Major Honours (International, National and State)

This following table includes only those titles recognised and organised by the AFC, AIFF and IFA:

Recent results of Kolkata Derby
The records of the meetings between the sides since 2014 have been listed below.
{| class="wikitable" style="text-align:center"
|-
!Date
!Home Team
!Result
!Away Team
!Stadium
!Competition
|-
|25 February 2023||East Bengal||0–2||ATK Mohun Bagan||Vivekananda Yuva Bharati Krirangan||ISL
|-
|29 October 2022||ATK Mohun Bagan||2–0||East Bengal||Vivekananda Yuva Bharati Krirangan||ISL
|-
|28 August 2022||East Bengal||0–1||ATK Mohun Bagan||Vivekananda Yuba Bharati Krirangan||Durand Cup
|-
|29 January 2022||ATK Mohun Bagan||3–1||East Bengal||Fatorda Stadium||ISL
|-
|27 November 2021||East Bengal||0–3||ATK Mohun Bagan||Tilak Maidan||ISL
|-
|19 February 2021||ATK Mohun Bagan||3–1||East Bengal||Fatorda Stadium||ISL
|-
|27 November 2020||East Bengal||0–2||ATK Mohun Bagan||Tilak Maidan||ISL
|-
|15 March 2020||East Bengal||–||Mohun Bagan||Vivekananda Yuba Bharati Krirangan||I-League
|-
|19 January 2020||Mohun Bagan||2–1||East Bengal||Vivekananda Yuba Bharati Krirangan||I-League
|-
|1 September 2019||Mohun Bagan||0–0||East Bengal||Vivekananda Yuba Bharati Krirangan||CFL
|-
|27 January 2019||Mohun Bagan||0–2||East Bengal||Vivekananda Yuba Bharati Krirangan||I-League
|-
|16 December 2018||East Bengal||3–2||Mohun Bagan||Vivekananda Yuba Bharati Krirangan||I-League
|-
|2 September 2018||East Bengal||2–2||Mohun Bagan||Vivekananda Yuba Bharati Krirangan||CFL
|-
|21 January 2018||East Bengal||0–2||Mohun Bagan||Vivekananda Yuba Bharati Krirangan||I-League
|-
|3 December 2017||Mohun Bagan||1–0||East Bengal||Vivekananda Yuba Bharati Krirangan||I-League
|-
|24 September 2017||East Bengal||2–2||Mohun Bagan||Kanchenjunga Stadium||CFL
|-
|14 May 2017||Mohun Bagan||2–0||East Bengal||Barabati Stadium||Federation Cup
|-
|9 April 2017||Mohun Bagan||2–1||East Bengal||Kanchenjunga Stadium||I-League
|-
|12 February 2017||East Bengal||0–0||Mohun Bagan||Kanchenjunga Stadium||I-League
|-
|7 September 2016||East Bengal||3–0||Mohun Bagan||Kalyani Stadium||CFL
|-
|-
|2 April 2016||East Bengal||2–1||Mohun Bagan||Kanchenjunga Stadium||I-League
|-
|23 January 2016||Mohun Bagan||1–1||East Bengal||Kanchenjunga Stadium||I-League
|-
|6 September 2015||East Bengal||4–0||Mohun Bagan||Vivekananda Yuba Bharati Krirangan||CFL
|-
|28 March 2015||Mohun Bagan||1–0||East Bengal||Vivekananda Yuba Bharati Krirangan||I-League
|-
|17 February 2015||East Bengal||1–1||Mohun Bagan||Vivekananda Yuba Bharati Krirangan||I-League
|-
|31 August 2014||East Bengal||3–1||Mohun Bagan||Vivekananda Yuba Bharati Krirangan||CFL
|-
|1 March 2014||East Bengal||1–1||Mohun Bagan||Vivekananda Yuba Bharati Krirangan||I-League
|-
|11 January 2014||East Bengal||0–1||Mohun Bagan||Vivekananda Yuba Bharati Krirangan||CFL

Since 2014, 28 matches have been played between the teams where:

 Mohun Bagan (now ATK Mohun Bagan) won: 14
 East Bengal won: 6
 8 matches were draws.
Highest scorer in a single match — Chidi Edeh (Mohun Bagan), scored 4 goals in 2009.

Head-to-head ranking in National Football League/I-League and Indian Super League

1996–97 to 2022-23 
Note: Red & Gold refers to East Bengal, while Green & White refers to Mohun Bagan and ATK Mohun Bagan

See also
South Indian Derby
List of association football club rivalries in Asia and Oceania
List of association football rivalries

Notes

References

Sport in Kolkata
East Bengal Club
Mohun Bagan AC
Association football rivalries in India